Foliicolous refers to the growth habit of certain lichens, algae, and fungi that prefer to grow on the leaves of vascular plants.  There have been about 700 species of foliicolous lichens identified, most of which are found in the tropics.

References

External links
Dr. Robert Lücking's Foliicolous Lichen Homepage

Lichens